Mónica Arreola (Mexico, 1976) is a visual artist, architect, and gallery director who lives and works in Tijuana, Mexico.

Artistic practice 
In 2006, Arreola showed at the Museum of Contemporary Art San Diego in Strange New World: Art and Design from Tijuana/Extraño Nuevo Mondo: Arte y diseño desde Tijuana. Arreola makes work that investigates architecture and the Mexico–United States border. In 2022, Arreola participated in the 2022 Whitney Biennial curated by Adrienne Edwards and David Breslin.

References

External links 
 MonicaArreola.com

Living people
1976 births
Mexican women artists